Mihalis is a Greek given name, equivalent to the English form Michael or Portuguese Miguel. It may refer to:

People:
Mihalis Yacalos (or just Mihalis) (born 1996), Greek-Brazilian singer and songwriter
Mihalis Filopoulos (1985–2007), Greek football fan who was murdered in 2007
Mihalis Hatzigiannis (born 1979), Greek-Cypriot singer and songwriter
Mihalis Papagiannakis (1941–2009), Greek politician
Mihalis Yannakakis (born 1953), Greek professor at Columbia University

Other:
"Mihalis", an instrumental song on David Gilmour's self-titled debut solo album.